Heru Nerly (24 September 1980 – 31 August 2021) was an Indonesian professional footballer who played as a winger. Before he turned professional, he worked as a fisherman.

Honours

Persipura Jayapura
Indonesia Super League: 2008–09

References

External links

1980 births
2021 deaths
People from Kupang
Sportspeople from East Nusa Tenggara
Indonesian footballers
Association football wingers
Indonesia international footballers
Persisam Putra Samarinda players
Persibo Bojonegoro players
Gresik United players
Persipura Jayapura players
Persija Jakarta players
PSM Makassar players
Semen Padang F.C. players
Mitra Kukar players
Liga 1 (Indonesia) players
Liga 2 (Indonesia) players
Fishers